Asmeret Asefaw Berhe is a soil biogeochemist and political ecologist who is the current Director of the Office of Science at the US Department of Energy. She was previously the Professor of Soil Biogeochemistry and the Ted and Jan Falasco Chair in Earth Sciences and Geology in the Department of Life and Environmental Sciences; University of California, Merced. Her research group worked to understand how soil helps regulate the earth's climate.

Education and early career 
Berhe was born and raised in Asmara, Eritrea. She received her Bachelors of Science in Soil and Water Conservation at the University of Asmara in Eritrea, where she was one of three women in a 55-person class in the soil science department. She later attended Michigan State University for her Masters in Political Ecology with an emphasis on the effects of land degradation, working to understand how landmines cause land degradation.

She then performed her doctoral work at University of California, Berkeley, where she received her PhD in Biogeochemistry in ecologist John Harte's laboratory, where she was also co-advised by Margaret Torn (Lawrence Berkeley National Laboratory) and Jennifer Harden (US Geological Survey, Menlo Park). Berhe's graduate work sought to understand how erosion affected the exchange of carbon between the land and the air. She found that erosion can actually cause soil to store more carbon. She continued her postdoctoral research at UC Berkeley with the support of the President's Postdoctoral Fellowship Program under the mentorship of Johan Six and Jillian Banfield, and then moved to University of California, Davis to continue her postdoctoral work.

Research 
Berhe's research interests center on the effect of changing environmental conditions—specifically fire, erosion, and climate change—on important soil processes. Her group is working to understand how perturbations in the environment affect how essential elements like carbon and nitrogen cycle through the soil system. One of her group's projects is to understand how drought and wildfire affect soil's ability to store carbon, taking her out to Yosemite National Park and the Sierra Nevada for fieldwork. Given the prevalence of drought in California, this work is of particular public importance, and as a result, has been highlighted by public figures like California Congressman Jerry McNerney (D-CA 9th District).

Her research extends to political ecology, working to understand the contribution of armed conflict to land degradation and how people interact with their environment. Berhe has co-authored a review taking stock of the relationship between global change, soil, and human security (including food security and water quality) in the 21st century, citing possible interventions and solutions for sustainable soil management.

Berhe's work has garnered support from a number of funding sources, including the National Science Foundation CAREER Award, the University of California President's Research Catalyst Awards, the United States Department of Energy, and more.

Advocacy and global impact work 
Berhe's work at the intersection of soil, climate change, and political ecology lends itself well to a number of global issues. During her graduate career, she was a member of the working group that produced the Millennium Ecosystem Assessment, which was called for by the United Nations Secretary Kofi Annan to assess the impact of humans on the environment. She was one of the lead authors on the 2005 report's chapter on "Drivers of Change in Ecosystem Condition and Services." The Assessment received the Zayed International Prize for the Environment in 2005.

In 2018, Berhe was selected as part of the inaugural National Academies of Sciences, Engineering, and Medicine New Voices in Sciences, Engineering, and Medicine cohort, as an early career leader working to advance the conversation around key emerging global issues and communicate the evidence base around those challenges.

An advocate for women in science, Berhe is currently a co-Principal Investigator of ADVANCEGeo, which is working to transform the workplace climate of the geosciences to increase retention of women in the field and develop a sustainable model that can be transferred to other scientific domains. Currently, the Earth Science Women's Network, the Association for Women Geoscientists, and the American Geophysical Union have partnered to address the issue of sexual harassment in the earth, space and environmental sciences. The program led by Erika Marín-Spiotta and is run with support from a four-year $1.1 million grant from the National Science Foundation.

She currently serves as an advisory board member of 500 Women Scientists, a grassroots organization working to make science open, inclusive, and accessible, and is on the leadership board of the Earth Science Women's Network.

In 2019 she delivered a TED talk on the role of soil in maintenance of the earth's climate, in particular relating soil use, degradation, and management with fluxes of greenhouse gases from the terrestrial ecosystem to the atmosphere.

Awards and honors 

University of California, Berkeley's President's Postdoctoral Fellowship Awardee, 2006
Hellman Family Foundation Fellow, 2011
NSF CAREER Award, 2014
Young Investigator Award, Sigma Xi, 2014
New Voices in Science, Engineering, and Medicine, National Academy of Sciences, 2018
Randolph W. “Bill” and Cecile T. Bromery Award, Geological Society of America, 2019
Great Immigrants Award, Carnegie Corporation of New York, 2020

References

External links 

TED Talk - A climate change solution that's just under our feet

Year of birth missing (living people)
Living people
Eritrean expatriates in the United States
Eritrean women scientists
University of California, Merced faculty
Soil scientists
Political ecologists
UC Berkeley College of Letters and Science alumni
Michigan State University alumni
African-American scientists
21st-century African-American people
United States Department of Energy officials
Biden administration personnel
American people of Eritrean descent